Jean Carlos Dondé, or simply Jean Carlos (born 12 August 1983), is a Brazilian former professional footballer who played as a defender.

Career
Dondé was born in Canoinhas. He played for Fluminense on loan from Feyenoord until 2007 when he got a transfer to Asteras Tripolis. On 23 February 2010, Atlético Paranaense signed the Brazilian striker from Greek side Asteras Tripolis. On 16 March 2011, he joined South Korean club Seongnam Ilhwa Chunma.

References

External links
 

1983 births
Living people
Brazilian footballers
Association football defenders
Club Athletico Paranaense players
Feyenoord players
Hamburger SV players
Fluminense FC players
Asteras Tripolis F.C. players
Seongnam FC players
Brazilian expatriate footballers
Bundesliga players
Eredivisie players
Super League Greece players
K League 1 players
Expatriate footballers in the Netherlands
Brazilian expatriate sportspeople in the Netherlands
Expatriate footballers in Germany
Brazilian expatriate sportspeople in Germany
Expatriate footballers in Greece
Brazilian expatriate sportspeople in Greece
Expatriate footballers in South Korea
Brazilian expatriate sportspeople in South Korea